A scaffold is a raised, stage-like site for public executions.

The execution was practised in public places. The "public spectacle" character of the execution was meant to deter the people from committing crimes, and demonstrate the authority of the Government, while simultaneously acting as a form of entertainment for the masses. For this purpose, the scaffold was often higher than a podium setup, and was therefore also called scaffold. 

Initially, beheading by an executioner was usually performed with a sword, axe, or hatchet, later executions were sometimes performed with a guillotine instead.

Scaffold in Hanau, Germany 

In the Wolfgang district of Hanau, on the grounds of the old Argonne barracks, still stands the scaffold named Höfer Heath. On , after a circumstantial process, the woman-murderer Johann Heinrich Nolte was beheaded. This was the last execution in Hanau. About  witnessed the event.

References 

Execution equipment
Capital punishment